Kroonia politzari is a moth in the family Cossidae. It is found in the Democratic Republic of Congo.

References

Natural History Museum Lepidoptera generic names catalog

Metarbelinae
Endemic fauna of the Democratic Republic of the Congo
Moths described in 2010